The 1921–22 Trinity Blue and White's basketball team represented Trinity College (later renamed Duke University) during the 1921–22 men's college basketball season. The head coach was James Baldwin, coaching his first season with Trinity. The team finished with an overall record of 6–12.

Schedule

|-

References

Duke Blue Devils men's basketball seasons
Duke
1921 in sports in North Carolina
1922 in sports in North Carolina